The siege of Tsingtao (or Tsingtau) was the attack on the German port of Tsingtao (now Qingdao) in China during World War I by Japan and the United Kingdom. The siege was waged against Imperial Germany between 27 August and 7 November 1914. The siege was the first encounter between Japanese and German forces, the first Anglo-Japanese operation of the war, and the only major land battle in the Asian and Pacific theatre during World War I.

Background

Throughout the late 19th and early 20th centuries, Germany joined other European powers in a scramble for colonial possessions. As with the other world powers (including the United States and Japan), Germany began to interfere in Chinese local affairs. After two German missionaries were killed in the Juye Incident in 1897, China was forced to agree to the Kiautschou Bay concession in Shantung (now Shandong) to Germany in 1898 on a 99-year lease. Germany then began to assert its influence across the rest of the province and built the city and port of Tsingtao, which became the base of the German East Asiatic Squadron of the Kaiserliche Marine (German Navy), which operated in support of the German colonies in the Pacific. Britain viewed the German presence in China with suspicion and leased Weihaiwei, also in Shantung, as a naval port and coaling station. Russia leased its own station at Port Arthur (now Lüshunkou) and France at Kwang-Chou-Wan. Britain also began to forge close ties with Japan, and diplomatic relations became closer, with the Anglo-Japanese Alliance being signed on 30 January 1902. Japan saw the alliance as a necessary deterrent to its main rival, Russia. Japan demonstrated its potential by its victory in the 1904–1905 Russo-Japanese War, and the alliance continued into World War I.

When the war in Europe began in August 1914, Britain promptly requested Japanese assistance. On 15 August, Japan issued an ultimatum, stating that Germany must withdraw her warships from Chinese and Japanese waters and transfer control of its port of Tsingtao to Japan. The next day, Major-General Mitsuomi Kamio, General Officer Commanding (GOC), 18th Infantry Division, was ordered to prepare to take Tsingtao by force. The ultimatum expired on 23 August, and Japan declared war on Germany. At the beginning of hostilities, the ships of the East Asia Squadron under Vice Admiral Maximilian von Spee were dispersed at various Pacific colonies on routine missions. Spee's ships rendezvoused in the Northern Mariana Islands for coaling.  then headed for the Indian Ocean, while the rest of the squadron made their way to the west coast of South America. The squadron engaged and destroyed two obsolescent ships of a small Royal Navy squadron at the Battle of Coronel, before itself being destroyed at the Battle of the Falkland Islands in the South Atlantic.

German defences

The Boxer Rebellion, at the beginning of the century, had led Germany to consider the defence of Tsingtao. The port and the town were divided from the rest of the peninsula by steep hills. The main line of defense lay along three hills, Mount Moltke, Mount Bismarck, and Mount Iltis, from the Kaiserstuhl to Litsuner Heights. Guarding the left wing was Fort Moltke, on the hill of the same name, with two 9.4 in. (240 mm) guns. The heaviest firepower was concentrated in the four 11 in. (280 mm) howitzers of Fort Bismarck. On the right wing, Fort Iltis contained two 9.4 in. guns at the hill's summit. A second  line of defense was set up along a closer line of steep hills. A network of trenches, batteries, and other fortifications had been built in preparation for the coming siege. Germany had strengthened the defenses from the sea by laying mines in the approaches to the harbor and building four batteries and five redoubts. The fortifications were well equipped (though some with obsolete Chinese artillery) and were well manned.

Prelude

On 27 August the Imperial Japanese Navy (IJN) sent ships under Vice-Admiral Sadakichi Kato, flying his flag in the pre-dreadnought , to blockade the coast of Kiaochow. The British Royal Navy (RN) strengthened the Japanese fleet by sending the China Station's pre-dreadnought  and the destroyer . On October 14, the Triumph was slightly damaged by a German shore battery, killing one member of its crew and injuring two others. The blockading fleet consisted mainly of nearly obsolete warships, though it did at times include a few modern vessels. These Japanese airplanes would also take part in another military first, a night-time bombing raid.

The 18th Infantry Division was the primary Japanese Army formation that took part in the initial landings, numbering some 23,000 soldiers with support from 142 artillery pieces. China protested against the Japanese violation of her neutrality but did not interfere in the operations.

The British Government and the other European great powers were concerned about Japanese intentions in the region and decided to send a small symbolic British contingent from Tientsin in an effort to allay their fears. The 1,500-man contingent was commanded by Brigadier-General Nathaniel Walter Barnardiston and consisted of 1,000 soldiers of the 2nd Battalion, The South Wales Borderers; later followed by 500 soldiers of the 36th Sikhs. Following a friendly fire incident, British troops were given Japanese raincoats to wear so they would be more easily identifiable to the Japanese.

The Germans responded to the threat against Tsingtao by concentrating all of their available East Asian troops in the city. Kaiser Wilhelm II made the defense of Tsingtao a top priority, saying that "... it would shame me more to surrender Tsingtao to the Japanese than Berlin to the Russians". The German garrison, commanded by naval Captain and Governor Alfred Meyer-Waldeck, consisted of the marines of III Seebataillon, naval personnel, Chinese colonial troops, and Austro-Hungarian sailors, for a total strength of 3,625 men.

On 22 August  of the China squadron, under the command of Lieutenant Commander F. A. Russell, while routinely monitoring the naval trade routes, encountered and was damaged in action by the German torpedo boat , the German gunboat SMS Lauting and a 4-inch shore battery off Tsingtao. She was hit twice from the retreating S90.

Siege

As the Japanese approached their positions, Meyer-Waldeck withdrew his forces from the two outer defensive lines and concentrated his troops on the innermost line of defense along the hills closest to the town. The Austro-Hungarian cruiser, SMS Kaiserin Elisabeth, was stationed in Tsingtao at the start of the war. On 2 September 1914 the German gunboat Jaguar sank the stranded Japanese destroyer Shirotaye. On 5 September a Japanese reconnaissance airplane scouted the port and reported that the Asian German fleet had departed, the Japanese ordered the dreadnought, pre-dreadnought, and cruiser to leave the blockade. The next day the second air-sea battle in history took place (the first air-sea battle in history was at the Balkan wars in 1913) when a Farman seaplane launched by the Wakamiya unsuccessfully attacked the Kaiserin Elisabeth and the Jaguar in Qiaozhou Bay with bombs. Early in the siege, the Kaiserin Elisabeth and German gunboat Jaguar made an unsuccessful sortie against Japanese vessels blockading Tsingtao. Later, the cruiser's 15cm and 4.7cm guns were removed from the ship and mounted onshore, creating the Batterie Elisabeth. The ship's crew took part in the defense of Tsingtao. On 13 September the Japanese land forces launched a cavalry raid on the German rear guard at Tsimo, which the Germans gave up and retreated. Subsequently, the Japanese took control of Kiautschou and the Santung railway. Lt. Gen. Kamio considered this the point of no return for his land forces and as the weather became extremely harsh he took no risk and fortified the troops at the town, returned the reinforcements that were on the way, re-embarked and landed at Lau Schan Bay.
On 26 September, Kamio resumed his advance, and the Germans were forced to retreat beyond the river Litsun. The Japanese made good time, crossing the river Paisha early in the day, swiftly crossing the seven-mile lowland plain and reaching the northern bank of the Litsun.

On September 27, Kamio tried to take Prince Heinrich Hill by a frontal assault and was caught in a murderous crossfire. From the summit, the Germans rained down bullets from four Maxim guns. Out in the harbor, Kaiserin Elisabeth and Leopard shelled the exposed slopes, nearly routing the Japanese right flank. The Japanese assault was saved by the allied fleet. As the siege progressed, the naval vessels trapped in the harbor, Cormoran, Iltis and Luchs, were scuttled on 28 September. On 17 October, the torpedo boat S-90 slipped out of Tsingtao harbor and fired a torpedo which sank the Japanese cruiser  with the loss of 271 officers and men. S-90 was unable to run the blockade back to Tsingtao and was scuttled in Chinese waters when the ship ran low on fuel. Tiger was scuttled on 29 October, Kaiserin Elisabeth on 2 November, followed finally by Jaguar on 7 November, the day the fortress surrendered to the Japanese forces.

The Japanese started shelling the fort and the city on 31 October and began digging parallel lines of trenches, just as they had done at the siege of Port Arthur nine years earlier. Very large 11inch howitzers from land, in addition to the firing of the Japanese naval guns, brought the German defenses under constant bombardment during the night, the Japanese moving their own trenches further forward under the cover of their artillery. The bombardment continued for seven days, employing around 100 siege guns with 1,200 shells each on the Japanese side. While the Germans were able to use the heavy guns of the port fortifications to bombard the landward positions of the Allies, they soon ran out of ammunition. When the artillery ran out of ammunition on 6 November, surrender was inevitable.

The German garrison was able to field only a single Etrich Taube airplane during the siege flown by Lieutenant Gunther Plüschow. (A second Etrich Taube piloted by Lt. Friedrich Müllerskowsky crashed early in the campaign). That airplane was used for frequent reconnaissance flights and Plüschow made several nuisance attacks on the blockading squadron dropping improvised munitions and other ordnance on them. Plüschow claimed the downing of a Japanese Farman MF.VII with his pistol, the first aerial victory in aviation history. Plüschow flew from Tsingtao on 6 November 1914 carrying the governor's last dispatches, which were forwarded to Berlin through neutral diplomatic channels.

On the night of 6 November, waves of Japanese infantry attacked the third line of defense and overwhelmed the defenders. The next morning, the German forces, along with their Austro-Hungarian allies, asked for terms. The Allies took formal possession of the colony on 16 November 1914.

Aftermath

As the German garrison was able to hold out for nearly two months despite the naval blockade with sustained artillery bombardment and being outnumbered 6 to 1, the defeat nevertheless temporarily served as a morale booster. The German defenders watched the Japanese with curiosity as they marched into Tsingtao but turned their backs on the British when they entered into town. So deep was their anger that some German officers spat in the faces of their British counterparts.

Japanese casualties numbered 733 killed and 1,282 wounded; the British had 12 killed and 53 wounded. The German defenders lost 199 dead and 504 wounded. The German dead were buried at Tsingtao, while the remaining soldiers were transported to prisoner of war camps in Japan. During the march to Tsingtao and the subsequent siege, Japanese forces killed 98 Chinese civilians and wounded 30; there were also countless incidents of rape against Chinese women committed by Japanese soldiers. The 4,700 German prisoners were treated well and with respect in Japan, such as in Bandō prisoner-of-war camp. The German troops were interned in Japan until the formal signature of the Versailles peace treaty in 1919, but due to technical questions, the troops were not repatriated before 1920. 170 prisoners chose to remain in Japan after the end of the war.

See also

 Japan during World War I
 Kiautschou Bay concession
 U-boat Campaign (World War I)

Notes

References

Sources

Further reading

External links

 German Colonial Uniforms

Tsingtao
Tsingtao
Tsingtao
Tsingtao
Tsingtao
Tsingtao
Tsingtao
German Empire in World War I
Tsingtao
Tsingtao
Tsingtao
Tsingtao
Tsingtao
Tsingtao
Japan in World War I
1914 in Japan
China in World War I
1914 in China
History of Qingdao
Last stands